"Wonderful Christmastime" is a Christmas song by English musician Paul McCartney. Recorded during the sessions for his solo album McCartney II (1980), it was released in November 1979 following Wings' final album Back to the Egg earlier that year. It was McCartney's first solo single in over eight years since "Eat at Home" in 1971. "Wonderful Christmastime" has charted within the top 10 in Austria, Germany, Ireland, Latvia, the Netherlands, and the United Kingdom as well as the top 20 in Canada, Slovakia, Sweden, and Switzerland. Despite being regarded as one of McCartney's weaker compositions by some music critics, it is a popular song during Christmas and has been covered throughout the years by numerous artists.

"Wonderful Christmastime" was added as a bonus track on the 1993 CD reissue of Back to the Egg and on the 2011 "Special Edition" and "Deluxe Edition" reissue of McCartney II; a longer, unedited version was also included on the Deluxe Edition. The track was also mixed in 5.1 surround sound for inclusion on the 2007 DVD release The McCartney Years.

Background and recording
McCartney wrote the song in the key of B major, and recorded it entirely on his own during the sessions for his solo project McCartney II. Although the members of Wings are not on the recording, they do appear in the promotional music video, which was filmed at the Fountain Inn in Ashurst, West Sussex.
It also includes footage filmed at the Hippodrome Theatre in Eastbourne, where McCartney rehearsed his 1979 UK tour.   Wings performed the song during their 1979 tour of the UK.

Reception and legacy
Following its release as a stand-alone single in the United Kingdom, "Wonderful Christmastime" peaked at number six on the UK Singles Chart on the week ending January 5, 1980. In the United States, the single peaked at number 83 on the Cash Box Top 100 Singles chart (week ending January 12, 1980) and at number 94 on the Record World Singles Chart (week ending December 29, 1979), but it did not initially make the Billboard Hot 100 chart.

"Wonderful Christmastime" first appeared on a Billboard magazine music chart in December 1984, when it peaked at number 10 for two straight weeks on the magazine's special Christmas Singles chart. Its next appearance on a Billboard music came on the week ending January 6, 1996, when the song both debuted and peaked at number 29 on the magazine's weekly Hot Adult Contemporary chart. "Wonderful Christmastime" finally debuted on the main Billboard Hot 100 chart in December 2018, at position number 47. It peaked at number 28 on the week ending January 2, 2021, following its 2020 chart re-entry two weeks earlier.

"Wonderful Christmastime" continues to receive substantial annual festive airplay, although some music critics consider it to be one of McCartney's mediocre compositions. Beatles author Robert Rodriguez has written of "Wonderful Christmastime": "Love it or hate it, few songs within the McCartney oeuvre have provoked such strong reactions."

Including royalties from cover versions, it was estimated in 2010 that McCartney makes $400,000 a year from this song, which puts its cumulative earnings at over $15 million.

Personnel
 Paul McCartney – vocals, keyboards, synthesisers, guitars, bass, drums, percussion, jingle bells, production

Charts

Weekly charts

Certifications

Kylie Minogue version

Australian singer Kylie Minogue and British singer-songwriter Mika covered the song for Minogue's reissue Kylie Christmas: Snow Queen Edition (2016). The song was released as album's second single on 9 December 2016 by Parlophone.

The song was performed on 6 December 2016 by Minogue and Mika on Italian programme Stasera Casa Mika.

Charts

Release history

Other cover versions

 Diana Ross on the 1994 album A Very Special Season which reached no. 37 in the UK and was certified Gold.
 2011: Eli Young Band on the compilation The Country Christmas Collection, peaking at No. 33 on the Billboard Hot Country Songs chart in January 2012
 2013: The a cappella group Straight No Chaser (with Paul McCartney) on their EP Under the Influence: Holiday Edition

References

External links
 Sold on Song (BBC Radio 2)

Mika (singer) songs
Paul McCartney songs
Lady A songs
1979 singles
2016 singles
British Christmas songs
Songs written by Paul McCartney
Song recordings produced by Paul McCartney
Parlophone singles
Columbia Records singles
Music published by MPL Music Publishing
1979 songs
British synth-pop songs